The Rätikon is a mountain range of the Central Eastern Alps, located at the border between Vorarlberg, Liechtenstein and Graubünden. It is the geological border between the Eastern and Western Alps and stretches from the Montafon as far as the Rhine. In the south, the Prättigau is its limit, and in the north, it is the Walgau. In the east, it borders the Silvretta groups.
The Rätikon mountain range derives its name from Raetia, a province of the Roman Empire, named after the Rhaetian (Raeti or Rhaeti) people.

Topography and geology 
The classification of the Rätikon to the central Eastern Alps is based solely on geographic-geological traditions. Large parts of the Rätikon consist of sedimentary rocks (limestone). From a geological point of view, the north-west Rätikon is assigned to the Northern Limestone Alps, while the South-West Rätikon belongs to the Bündner Schist/Bündner slate of the Western Alps.

Peaks 

Its chief peaks are:
Schesaplana  2964 m (9725 ft)
Schiltfluh   2890 m (9482 ft)
Panüelerkopf 2859 m (9380 ft)
Drusenfluh   2829 m (9282 ft)
Madrisahorn  2830 m (9285 ft)
Sulzfluh     2820 m (9252 ft)
Wildberg 2788 m (9147 ft)
Rätschenhorn 2703 m (8868 ft)
Zimbaspitze 2643 m (8678 ft)
Schijenflue 2627 m (8619 ft)
Vorder Grauspitz 2599 m (8528 ft)
Falknis      2566 m (8419 ft)
Naafkopf     2571 m (8445 ft)
Hornspitze   2537 m (8323 ft)
Glegghorn    2447 m (8028 ft)
Vilan        2376 m (7795 ft)
Sassauna     2308 m (7572 ft)

For a list of passes see Passes of the Silvretta and Rätikon Ranges.

A multiday hike that follows a big portion of the Rätikon chain on its southern side is called "Prättigauer Höhenweg".

Neighboring mountain groups 
The Rätikon is adjacent to the following other mountain groups in the Alps:
 In the north-east to the Bregenz Forest Mountains and to the Lechquellen Mountains, these two groups belong to the Northern Limestone Alps in the Eastern Alps.
 In the east to the Verwall Alps (Central Alps)
 In the southeast to the Silvretta Alps (Central Alps)
 In the south-west to the Plessur Alps (Central Alps)
 In the west to the Glarus Alps (Western Alps)
 In the north-west of the Appenzell Alps (Western Alps)

Tourism 
Because of the many mountains, the Rätikon is a first class area for all alpine sports such as hiking, skiing (including freeriding), cross-country skiing, mountain biking, etc. The position of the mountain chain allows for beautiful and panoramic views. The cableways permit shortened ascents and descents and enable pure high-altitude hiking.

Thanks to many Alpine shelters ("huts"), daylong or multi-day walks are possible. Many huts are hosted and offer sleeping accommodations. The season usually starts in early April to late September / October, depending on the weather. Before starting a tour, it is advisable to inquire about vacancies and locations at regional tourist offices or in the different villages.

Mountain Huts 
Mountain huts operated by the following organizations are found in the Vorarlberg part of the Rätikon: German, Austrian Alpine Club and friends of nature Austria:
 Douglasshütte near Brand
 Feldkircherhütte near Feldkirch
 Haus Matschwitz on Matschwitz near Latschau
 Heinrich-Hueter-Hütte near Vandans
 Lindauer Hütte near Tschagguns
 Madrisahütte near Gargellen
 Mannheimer Hütte near Brand
 Oberzalimhütte near Brand
 Sarotlahütte near Brand
 Schwabenhaus on the Tschengla near Bürserberg
 Tilisunahütte near Tschagguns
 Totalphütte near Brand
 Alpine Restaurant "Gamperdona" near Nenzinger Himmel

In Liechtenstein's part of the Rätikon, the following huts of the Liechtensteiner Alpenverein may be found:
 Gafadurahütte near Nendeln
 Pfälzerhütte near Steg

In the Graubünden or Grisons Rätikon, huts of the Swiss Alpine Club and other mountain houses may be found:
 Enderlinhütte near Maienfeld
 Schesaplanahütte near Seewis im Prättigau
 Carschinahütte near St. Antönien
 Mountain huts Sulzfluh and Alpenrösli near St. Antönien

Mountain railways 
In Montafon/Vorarlberg:
 Lünerseebahn near Brand
 Golmerbahn in Vadans/Tschagguns
 Bergbahnen Gargellen

In Grison/Graubünden:
 Älplibahn Malans
 Seilbahn Fanas
 Madrisa Klosters Bergbahnen

See also
 Limestone Alps
 Swiss Alps

References 

Mountain ranges of the Alps
Rhaetian Alps
Mountain ranges of Vorarlberg
Mountain ranges of Switzerland
Mountains of Liechtenstein
Mountain ranges of Graubünden